Ron Mamiya (born 1949) is an American lawyer, judge, and Japanese-American community organizer who comes from a family with a long record of community service in Washington State (USA). Mamiya's expertise is in the role of interpreters in the court system as well as making substantive court decisions involving cases of driving while intoxicated.

Education
Mamiya is a graduate of Franklin High School in Seattle, WA in 1967.  He attended college at the University of Washington and received his J.D. degree from Gonzaga University School of Law.  He is a third generation Japanese-American whose family immigrated to Washington state from Japan.

Career
Mamiya is a judge on the Seattle (WA) Municipal Court. He has been appointed by the WA State Supreme Court to numerous commissions including the Judicial Administration Commission, Minority and Justice Commission, State Court Interpreter Taskforce, and the State District and Municipal Court Judges' Association board.

Expertise in the issue of court translation
Mamiya is an expert in the issue of language translation in court and has written "Selected Cases on Legal Interpreting" for the American Bar Association. He is a former delegate to Japan for the JALD, Japanese American Leadership Delegate Program. He is also a member of the Court Interpreter Commission.

Mamiya is a contributing editor to The Pro Se Guidebook, a guidebook for citizens to represent themselves in court.

Selected judicial cases
Mamiya was involved in the adjudication of actress Heather Locklear case involving impaired driving.  Mamiya was also the presiding judge in Seattle v. Carnell in 1995 holding that the defendant's objection to the foundation for admitting the defendant's breath alcohol test results was sufficient to preserve the issue for review. This judgment was upheld by the appeals court.

Mamiya is President of the Nikkei Heritage Association of Washington.  He has been quoted in various issues in news reports involving the Japanese-American community in Washington state.

Sexual harassment suit
A former Seattle Municipal Court employee filed a sexual harassment suit against Mamiya, claiming that even after ending an affair the two had been having in 2008, Mamiya continued to kiss and touch her. The case was settle out of court in March 2009 for $135,000.

Personal life
Mamiya was married and has two sons.

References

American lawyers
Living people
1949 births
University of Washington alumni
Gonzaga University School of Law alumni
American jurists of Japanese descent
Franklin High School (Seattle) alumni